Roma Potiki (born 1958) is a New Zealand poet, playwright, visual artist, curator, theatre actor and director, as well as a commentator on Māori theatre. She is of Te Rarawa, Te Aupōuri and Ngāti Rangitihi descent. As well as being a published poet, her work is included in the permanent collection of the Dowse Art Museum.

Background 
Roma Potiki was born in Lower Hutt, a city in the Wellington Region, and grew up in the suburb Wainuiomata. As a child she attended Wainuiomata Primary School, Woodhatton Primary School, Wainuiomata College and Wellington High School. Her first play was written while at primary school and she also started writing poetry at school.

Career 
Roma Potiki was involved in contemporary Māori theatre in early formative years. She was in a play performed by Te Ika A Maui Players in 1978 called Death of the Land by Rore Hapipi's (Rowley Habib). She went on to help form the Māori theatre company Maranga Mai in 1979. This company was linked to the Māori protest movement and they toured a theatre production in 1979 - 1980 to marae and schools. In 1990 she was a founding director of another theatre company He Ara Hou. They performed and toured a play called Whatungarongaro. This play was directed by Potiki and John Anderson and devised over nine months with the company members. Potiki had previously done workshops with a theatre company PETA (Philippines Educational Theatre Association) and was influenced by their way of working.

Roma Potiki's writing includes poetry contribution to many anthologies, as well as published volumes. She has written the forward to books of New Zealand Māori plays and contributed text to exhibition catalogues. As a fine artist Potiki has exhibited art work and one of her pieces Hinewai is in the collection of the Dowse Art Museum.

Legacy 
The poem Stones in her Mouth by Potiki inspired contemporary New Zealand choreographer Lemi Ponifasio to create a community leadership project also called Stones in her Mouth in 2013. This involved a group of Māori women holding workshops at marae and writing text that was then performed.

He Ara Hou and Whatungarongaro 
Before actor Rena Owen was in Once Were Warriors she performed a similar role in theatre company He Ara Hou's play Whatungarongaro that Potiki a co-creator of. Owens performance in Whatungarongaro influenced her being cast in Once Were Warriors.

Playwright and director of theatre company Tawata Productions Hone Kouka cites seeing Whatungarongaro in 1991 at the Depot Theatre in Wellington as being life changing and convincing him that innovative Māori theatre had no boundaries. Another New Zealand theatre and film writer Briar Grace-Smith was an assistant to Potiki and learnt from the process of making Whatungarongaro.

Published works

Poetry 

Stones in Her Mouth (1992) Publisher: Tamakimakaurau, N.Z. IWA
Roma Potiki (1995) Publisher: Wai-te-ata Press, Wellington, N.Z.
Shaking the Tree (1998) Publisher: Steele Roberts, Wellington, N.Z.
Oriori: a Māori Child is Born: From Conception to Birth (1999) co-authored with Robyn Kahukiwa. Publisher: Wai-te-ata Press, Wellington, NZ

Plays 

Whatungarongaro (1990) Roma Potiki and He Ara Hou. Published in Ta Matou Mangai: Three Plays of the 1990s: Irirangi Bay, Taku Mangai, Whatungarongaro (1999) ed. Hone Kouka. Publisher: Victoria University Press, Wellington, N.Z.
Going Home (1996)

Other 

Introduction - He Reo Hou: 5 Plays by Māori playwrights (1991) ed. Simon Garrett. Publisher: Playmarket, Wellington, N.Z.
Robyn Kahukiwa : Works from 1985 - 1995 (1995) Exhibition catalogue. Includes essays by Anne Kirker and Jonathan Mané-Wheoki, and an interview by Roma Potiki. Publisher: Bowen Galleries, Wellington N.Z.
Foreword - Waiora (1997) by Hone Kouka
Memory Walking (1998) "Exhibition of contemporary paintings, prints and installation work by eight women artists from around the world." Text by Roma Potiki. Exhibiting artists: Lubaina Himid, Michi itami, Robyn Kahukiwa, Jean LaMarr, Lily Laita, Debra Priestly, Maud Sulter, Judy Watson. Publisher: City Gallery, Wellington N.Z.

Anthologies 
Roma Potiki is widely published in anthologies.

Selected list:

Te Ao Marama: Vol 4: Contemporary Maori Writing for Children (1994) ed. Witi Ihimaera
Oxford (1997)
My Heart Goes Swimming : New Zealand Love Poems (2000) ed. Jenny Bornholdt, Gregory O'Brien

Further reading 
 Calling the Taniwha: Mana Wahine Maori and the Poetry of Roma Potiki, a research paper about Roma Potiki's poetry by Kelly Lambert.
 First Māori theatre companies, 1970–1990

References

1958 births
Living people
New Zealand women artists
New Zealand contemporary artists
New Zealand women dramatists and playwrights
New Zealand stage actresses
New Zealand theatre directors
New Zealand women poets
New Zealand women curators
People from Lower Hutt
Te Rarawa people
Te Aupōuri people
Ngāti Rangitihi people
20th-century New Zealand actresses
20th-century New Zealand dramatists and playwrights
20th-century New Zealand poets
20th-century New Zealand women writers
21st-century New Zealand actresses
21st-century New Zealand dramatists and playwrights
21st-century New Zealand poets
21st-century New Zealand women writers
People educated at Wainuiomata High School
People educated at Wellington High School, New Zealand